The World Military Championships (WMC) are the world championships of the military sports, regularly organized by the Conseil International du Sport Militaire, in each of the 26 disciplines of the sport military.

History
CISM had its roots in World War II. Eighty-two free world nations competed in about 24 different sports. The United States participates in 12 of those sports. Athletes who have done well at the interservice championships, national and international level are invited into a CISM training camp, which operates much like military training camps. "It’s the highest level of competition aside from Pan American and Olympic Games," said William Fleming, head of the U.S. Navy Sports Program Branch. "CISM is kind of like the international military olympics." Military athletes often are competing against Olympic competitors in CISM games and World Military Championships, hence the nickname "The Military Olympics."

Championships
In the year of the Military World Games (from 1995, every four years), championship shall be the same of the World Games tournament.

See also

 International Military Sports Council
 Military World Games
 World University Championships
 World School Championships

References

External links
World Military Championships from site of the CISM
http://www.milsport.one/